Stephen Eric Litt (born 21 May 1954) is an English retired football defender who played professionally in the Football League, North American Soccer League and Major Indoor Soccer League and coached in the Western Soccer Alliance.

Player
Litt began his career as an apprentice with Blackpool  In 1972, Litt left Blackpool for Luton Town. He cracked the first team in 1973, but made only fifteen total first team appearances. In 1976, he left England for the United States where he signed with the Minnesota Kicks of the North American Soccer League. He returned to England on loan to Northampton Town F.C. during the 1977–1978 season. In 1982, Litt moved to the San Jose Earthquakes for three outdoor and one indoor seasons. In 1984, he returned to Minnesota, this time as a member of the Minnesota Strikers playing in the Major Indoor Soccer League. He retired from playing professionally in the spring of 1985 and turned to coaching.

Coach
In 1985, the San Jose Earthquakes hired Litt as head coach of its reserve team. In 1986, Litt served as the head coach of the Earthquakes in the Western Soccer Alliance. In August 1986, he left the team after going unpaid for over a month. In 2008, he became an assistant coach with the Dakota County Technical College soccer team.

References

External links
 NASL/MISL stats

1954 births
Living people
English footballers
English football managers
English expatriate footballers
Golden Bay Earthquakes (MISL) players
Luton Town F.C. players
Major Indoor Soccer League (1978–1992) players
Minnesota Kicks players
Minnesota Strikers (MISL) players
North American Soccer League (1968–1984) indoor players
North American Soccer League (1968–1984) players
San Jose Earthquakes (1974–1988) players
San Jose Earthquakes (1974–1988) coaches
Western Soccer Alliance coaches
Northampton Town F.C. players
English Football League players
Association football defenders
English expatriate sportspeople in the United States
Expatriate soccer players in the United States